3rd Album Part B: Growing Season is a studio album by Korean singer Younha, released on December 11, 2009. While technically her fourth Korean album, it is only a part of the third album as a whole, as referenced by the album title.

Track listing 
 "Say Something" (Colette Trudeau, Davor Vulama, Younha) - 3:21
 "오늘 헤어졌어요" (Oneul Heeojyeosseoyo, "Broke up today") (이관, hwayobi) - 4:21
 "좋아해" (Joahae, "I like you") (Gustav Efraimsson, Vincent Digiorgio, Le Pont, NANA) - 3:02
 "편한가봐" (Pyeonhangabwa, "Must be easy") (You Hee-yeol, 양재선) - 4:54
 "헤어진 후에야 알 수 있는 것" (duet with Kim Bum Soo) (Hae-eo-jin hueya al su itneun geot, "Something that can be understood after a breakup") (이관, NANA) - 3:47
 "LaLaLa" (Younha) - 3:09
 "스물두 번째 길" (Seumuldu beonjjae gil, "22nd street") (Younha, 비가 내리면) - 3:21
 "오늘 헤어졌어요 (Inst.)" - 4:21
 "헤어진 후에야 알 수 있는 것 (Inst.)" - 3:47

References

External links 
 Younha Official Website (Korean language)

2009 albums
Younha albums
Genie Music albums